George Washington is an outdoor 1955 bronze sculpture by Italian American artist Pompeo Coppini, located on the University of Texas at Austin campus in Austin, Texas, in the United States.

Background

Coppini sculpted three distinct statues of Washington. The first was installed in 1912 in Mexico City. The second was created to commemorate the 1926 sesquicentennial of the Declaration of Independence and was dedicated in Portland in 1927. The third statue was installed in February 1955 on the campus of the University of Texas at Austin.

See also

 1955 in art
 List of monuments dedicated to George Washington
 List of sculptures of presidents of the United States
 List of statues of George Washington

References

External links
 

1955 establishments in Texas
1955 sculptures
Bronze sculptures in Texas
Monuments and memorials in Texas
Monuments and memorials to George Washington in the United States
Outdoor sculptures in Austin, Texas
Sculptures by Pompeo Coppini
Sculptures of men in Texas
Statues in Austin, Texas
Statues of George Washington
University of Texas at Austin campus
Works by Italian people